List of schools in the Roman Catholic Archdiocese of Boston.

In 2020 the primary and secondary schools of the archdiocese had about 30,000 students and numbered 112.

Elementary-Age 22 schools
 Cardinal Cushing School (Hanover)
 Saint Coletta Day School (Braintree)

PK-12 schools

5-12 schools

6-12 schools

7-12 schools

High schools

In 2020 Sacred Heart Schools announced that its high school division would close.

PK-9 schools
 Saint Agnes School (Arlington)

PK-8 schools
With former high school divisions:

Other:
 Academy of Notre Dame (Tyngsboro)
 Blessed Sacrament School (Walpole)
 Cheverus Catholic School (Malden)
 East Boston Central Catholic School (East Boston, Boston)
 Holy Name Parish School (West Roxbury)
 Immaculate Conception School (Lowell)
 Immaculate Conception School (Marlborough)
 Immaculate Conception School (Newburyport)
 Immaculate Conception School (Revere)
 Lawrence Catholic Academy (Lawrence)
 Our Lady of the Assumption School (Lynnfield)
 Our Lady's Academy (Waltham)
 Quincy Catholic Academy (Quincy)
 Sacred Heart Elementary School (Weymouth) - It is in Weymouth Landing. Merging in 2020 with St. Francis Xavier in the wake of the COVID-19 pandemic
 Sacred Heart School (Roslindale)
 Sacred Hearts School (Bradford)
 Saint Agatha School (Milton)
 Saint Anthony School (Everett)
 Saint Augustine School (Andover)
 Saint Bridget School (Abington)
 Saint Bridget School (Framingham)
 Saint Catherine of Siena School (Norwood)
 Saint Charles Elementary School (Woburn)
 Saint Columbkille Partnership School (Brighton)
 Saint Francis Xavier School (Weymouth) - It is in the south of the city. Merging in 2020 with Sacred Heart in the wake of the COVID-19 pandemic.
 Saint John School (Boston)
 Saint John the Baptist School (Peabody)
 Saint John the Evangelist School (Canton)
 Saint Joseph Elementary School (Holbrook)
 Saint Joseph School (Medford)
 Saint Joseph School (Wakefield)
 Saint Mary of the Annunciation School (Melrose)
 Saint Mary of the Annunciation School (Danvers)
 Saint Mary of the Assumption Elementary School (Brookline)
 Saint Mary of the Hills School (Milton)
 Saint Michael Elementary School (Lowell)
 Saint Michael School (Andover)
 Saint Monica School (Methuen)
 Saint Patrick School (Stoneham)
 Saint Patrick School (Roxbury)
 Saint Patrick School & Educational Center (Lowell)
 Saint Paul School (Hingham)
 Saint Peter School (Cambridge)
 Saint Pius V Elementary School (Lynn)
 Saint Raphael Parish School (Medford)
 Saint Rose of Lima School (Chelsea)
 Saint Theresa Catholic School (Somerville) - Originally its name was St. Catherine of Genoa School
 St. John Paul II Catholic Academy (Dorchester) - Includes the Columbia, Lower Mills, and Neponset campuses.
 Ste Jeanne d'Arc School (Lowell)
 The Saints Academy (Beverly)
 Trinity Catholic Academy (Brockton) - Includes the Lower Campus and the Upper Campus

3-8 schools
 Saint Paul's Choir School (Cambridge)

4-8 schools
 Mother Caroline Academy (Dorchester)
 Nativity Preparatory School (Jamaica Plain)

5-8 schools
 Bellesini Academy (Lawrence)

6-8 schools
 Monsignor Haddad Middle School (Needham)

PK-6 schools
 Jackson Walnut Park Schools (Newton), includes Walnut Park Montessori
 Mount Alvernia Academy (Newton)
 Our Lady of Perpetual Help Mission Grammar School (Roxbury)
 Saint Benedict Elementary School (South Natick)
 Saint Brendan School (Dorchester)
 Saint John the Evangelist School (Wellesley Hills)
 Saint Theresa of Avila School (West Roxbury)
 South Boston Catholic Academy (South Boston)

1-6 schools
 Sacred Heart Elementary School (Kingston)

PK-5 schools
 Sacred Heart School (Lynn) (formerly until grade 8)
 Saint Joseph Elementary School (Needham)
 Saint Mary's School (Winchester)

Preschool and Kindergarten

 Good Shepherd Early Childhood (Charlestown)
 Sacred Heart Early Childhood Center (Kingston)

Former schools

Former 6-12 schools

Former high schools

PK-8 schools (former)
 Charlestown Catholic Elementary School (Charlestown) - The final remaining Catholic school in the neighborhood, it closed in 2003. Multiple parents were unhappy with the closure.
 Franco American School (Lowell) (private) It was established on the Ayer Estate as an orphanage for French American children after the Missionary Oblates of Mary Immaculate purchased the property in September 1908. Various extra facilities were added to the property. It was originally a boarding school only but hosted non-boarding children by the 1950s and then ended boarding in 1978. It closed in 2016. Coalition for a Better Acre and TMI Property Management & Development together purchased the facility for $2.3 million in 2017.
 Saint Francis of Assisi School (Braintree) - It opened circa 1960. The archdiocese closed in 2020 in the wake of the COVID-19 pandemic. Parents started a petition to ask the archdiocese to not close the school, which got signed over 2,000 times, but the archdiocese maintained its decision.
 St. Catherine of Siena School (Charlestown) - Opened in 1911
 Saint Jerome Elementary School (Weymouth) - It is in the north of the city. Circa 2010 the school had 210 students; by 2020 this was down to 158, and the archdiocese projected enrollment for 2020-2021 to be circa 110. Closed in 2020 on the orders of the archdiocese in the wake of the COVID-19 pandemic.
 St. Joseph Elementary School (Roxbury) - Closed in 2003.
 Saint Louis School (Lowell) - Closed in 2020 in the wake of the COVID-19 pandemic.

References

External links
 Catholic Schools Office of the Roman Catholic Archdiocese of Boston

Boston, Roman Catholic Archdiocese of
Boston
Education in Boston
Schools